is a vertically scrolling shooter released in arcades by Konami in 1987.

Legacy
Flak Attack was made available on Microsoft's Game Room service for its Xbox 360 console and for Windows-based PCs on September 15, 2010. It was also re-released for PlayStation 4 in 2016 and Nintendo Switch in 2020, as part of the Hamster Corporation's Arcade Archives series.

Reception 
In Japan, Game Machine listed Flak Attack on their September 15, 1987 issue as being the seventh most-successful table arcade unit of the month.

References

1987 video games
Arcade video games
Konami games
Nintendo Switch games
PlayStation 4 games
Vertically scrolling shooters
Konami arcade games
Video games developed in Japan

Hamster Corporation games